In probability theory, a Cauchy process is a type of stochastic process.  There are symmetric and asymmetric forms of the Cauchy process.   The unspecified  term "Cauchy process" is often used to refer to the symmetric Cauchy process.

The Cauchy process has a number of properties:

It is a Lévy process
It is a stable process
It is a pure jump process
Its moments are infinite.

Symmetric Cauchy process
The symmetric Cauchy process can be described by a Brownian motion or Wiener process subject to a Lévy subordinator. The Lévy distribution is a special case of the inverse-gamma distribution.

The Lévy distribution is the probability of the first hitting time for a Brownian motion, and thus the Cauchy process is essentially the result of two independent Brownian motion processes.

The marginal characteristic function of the symmetric Cauchy process has the form:

The marginal probability distribution of the  symmetric Cauchy process is the Cauchy distribution whose density is

Asymmetric Cauchy process
The asymmetric Cauchy process is defined in terms of a parameter . Here
 is the skewness parameter, and its absolute value must be less than or equal to 1.  In the case where  the process is considered a completely asymmetric Cauchy process.

The characteristic function of the asymmetric Cauchy distribution has the form:

The marginal probability distribution of the asymmetric Cauchy process is a stable distribution with index of stability (i.e., α parameter) equal to 1.

References

Lévy processes